The Superior Court of California, County of San Bernardino, also known as the San Bernardino County Superior Court or  San Bernardino Superior Court, is the branch of the California superior court with jurisdiction over San Bernardino County.

History
San Bernardino County was partitioned from Los Angeles County in 1853. San Bernardino was named the county seat, and the first county judge was Daniel M. Thomas, elected in January 1853. County affairs were conducted in the old Mormon Council-House, which was at the corner of Third and Grafton streets.

In 1858, the county built its first building, a jail, and rented a residence built originally by Q.S. Sparks at the corner of Fifth and E, to serve as the county offices until 1862, when court was moved to the former residence of Charles Glasier. This was a two-story wooden building and served until the first court house was completed in 1874 or 1878. Judge Thomas was succeeded by A.D. Boren in 1857; although M.H. Crafts won a considerable number of votes in the election of 1861, Judge Boren continued to serve as Crafts failed to follow up. Judge Boren served until 1871, succeeded by Judge Henry M. Willis, who would serve until the Superior Court system was implemented in 1879. The first Superior Court judge was H.C. Rolfe, who had previously served as the District Judge from 1872 to 1875.

The 1874 courthouse served until 1898, when the second courthouse was completed. The Hall of Records was built in 1891 using proceeds from a tax that raised . Two more propositions to issue bonds funding the construction of a new courthouse were also defeated, so the board of supervisors again levied a direct tax to complete the 1898 courthouse. The 1898 courthouse was designed by Charles H. Jones and was damaged in an earthquake in 1923, then demolished in 1928.

A new courthouse was completed in 1928 to a design by Howard E. Jones, the nephew of Charles H. Jones, who had designed the 1898 courthouse. The facade and cornerstone state the building was erected in 1926. It was dedicated on April 30, 1927. The 1928 courthouse was listed on the National Register of Historic Places in 1997.

A new San Bernardino Justice Center was completed in 2014 and occupied on March 12 of that year, designed by Skidmore, Owings, & Merrill and containing  of floor space with 35 courtrooms.

Venues

The branch court in Redlands was consolidated and integrated into the new San Bernardino Justice Center after that building was completed in 2014.

References

External links
 
 

Superior Court
Superior courts in California